Bardoňovo is a municipality and village in the Nové Zámky District in the Nitra Region of south-west Slovakia.

History
In historical records the village was first mentioned in 1269.

Geography
The village lies at an altitude of 193 metres and covers an area of 23.81 km2. It has a population of about 880 people.

Ethnicity
Original Magyar settlement, founded at the beginning of the 11th century, just after the "Pozsony Battle", led by Dux Árpád. The original Magyar population's majority was expelled to Hungary and/or brutally deported to Sudetenland between 1945 - 1949. Population's majority was originally Magyar and belonged to Reformed (Calvinist) Church.  Following the "Benes -Kassa-Kosice- Decret" from 1945. At present, however, - following the immigration of Slovaks - the population is about 61% Slovak and 39% Hungarian.

Facilities
The village has two cemeteries, three pubs and a mansion (Zigmund Kelecsenyi).

Genealogical resources

The records for genealogical research are available at the state archive "Statny Archiv in Nitra, Slovakia" 
 Roman Catholic church records (births/marriages/deaths): 1733-1895 (parish B)
 Lutheran church records (births/marriages/deaths): 1785-1896 (parish B)
 Reformated church records (births/marriages/deaths): 1784-1895 (parish B)

See also
 List of municipalities and towns in Slovakia

External links
https://web.archive.org/web/20070427022352/http://www.statistics.sk/mosmis/eng/run.html 
Surnames of living people in Bardonovo
Bardoňovo – Nové Zámky okolie

Villages and municipalities in Nové Zámky District